Barrows Dunham (October 10, 1905 – November 19, 1995) was an American author and professor of philosophy. Best known for popular works of philosophy such as Man against Myth (1947) and Heroes and Heretics (1963), Dunham also gained notoriety as a martyr for academic freedom when he was fired from Temple University in 1953 after refusing to “name names” before the House Un-American Activities Committee.

Life 
Dunham was born on October 10, 1905, in Mount Holly Township, New Jersey into a Philadelphia family with progressive leanings. His maternal grandfather had commanded a regiment of freed slaves in the Civil War, and his father James Henry Dunham was a Presbyterian minister who resigned his ministry in 1912, when Barrows was seven years old, because his study of philosophy and science, begun in the 1880s and 90s at the then College of New Jersey and at the University of Berlin,  led him ultimately to disbelieve in supernatural religion. He took a Ph.D. in philosophy from the University of Pennsylvania in 1913 and went on to become a professor and dean at Temple University, where his son would eventually come to teach as well.

Barrows was educated in a Philadelphia private Quaker grade school and high school, the William Penn Charter School and, for a final pre-university year, at Lawrenceville School, through all of which he absorbed a full classical education, including Greek. At Princeton he was introduced to the formal study of philosophy, and though he began teaching English at Franklin and Marshall College upon receiving his A.B. from Princeton in 1926, Dunham returned to Princeton in 1928 to pursue a master's degree and, ultimately, a Ph.D. in philosophy. His dissertation was titled Kant's Theory of the Universal Validity of the Esthetic Judgment, later published as A Study in Kant's Aesthetics.

Called before the House Committee on Un-American Activities on February 27, 1953, Dunham refused to answer any of the questions posed to him, providing only his name, date of birth, and birthplace. He invoked his Fifth Amendment constitutional privilege against self-incrimination in response to all further questions. The choice to defy the Committee so early in his testimony was a direct by-product of successful criminal prosecutions against prior witnesses (such as the Hollywood Ten) who had declined to answer based upon the First Amendment protections of freedom of speech and association and others who had answered some questions about themselves but unsuccessfully asserted the Fifth Amendment privilege as a basis to decline to provide information about others.

As a result of his refusal to cooperate with the Committee, Dunham was immediately suspended by Temple University.  He was fired on September 23, 1953 for supposed "intellectual arrogance" and "obvious contempt of Congress."  Congress formally cited him for contempt on May 11, 1954.  He was criminally tried in the United States District Court for the District of Columbia in October 1955 and acquitted.  Temple University did not reinstate Dr. Dunham, and he was blacklisted from academic employment for fourteen years, until he received a visiting professorship at the University of Pennsylvania School of Social Work in 1971.  Temple University was censured by the American Association of University Professors for its treatment of Dunham.

In 1981 the Board of Trustees of Temple University reinstated Dunham, following a recommendation by President Marvin Wachman, acknowledging that they should not have dismissed him for exercising his constitutional rights. Dunham became a professor emeritus and was awarded a lifetime pension. The pressure to reinstate Dunham came from the Faculty Senate and Fred Zimring, an academic advisor in the College of Liberal Arts  who had investigated the case in his doctoral dissertation, "McCarthyism, the Cold War, and Temple University: the Dismissal of Professor Barrows Dunham from Temple."

Bibliography
 Ethics, Dead and Alive (1971) 
 Heroes and Heretics: A Political History of Western Thought (1964)
 Thinkers and Treasurers (1960)
 Artist in Society (1960)
 Giant in Chains (1953)
  Man against Myth (1947)
 A Study in Kant's Aesthetics: The Universal Validity of Aesthetic Judgments (1934)

See also
 American philosophy
 List of American philosophers

References

1905 births
1995 deaths
Humboldt University of Berlin alumni
People from Mount Holly, New Jersey
Princeton University alumni
Temple University faculty
University of Pennsylvania alumni
20th-century American philosophers